Jack Buckley may refer to:

 Jack Buckley (English footballer) (1903–1985), English footballer
 Jack Buckley (footballer, born 1907) (1907–1980), Australian rules footballer for Fitzroy
 Jack Buckley (footballer, born 1997), Australian rules footballer for Greater Western Sydney
 John R. Buckley (1932–2020), American politician